Diphlebia is a genus of damselflies in the family Lestoideidae.
They are commonly known as rockmasters. These damselflies are very large and thick. The species in this genus are found in Eastern Australia, except for one species that can be found in New Guinea.  The males are vividly patterned. They are blue or bluish green and black in colour. Their blue colour also gives them the name azure damselflies.  They rest with their wings spread out. Their wings are usually blackish brown or have white markings. These damselflies have several present antenodal crossveins. The two basal crossveins extend across costal and subcostal spaces. The larvae are wide and flat. They have long saccoid gills enabling them to breathe underwater. The inner tooth of their labial palps is elongated. The specific characters of the larva are mid-ventral, distal width, basal width, and length of median lobe.

Species 
Diphlebia includes five species that are found in eastern Australia and New Guinea. The following are the species.
Diphlebia coerulescens  - sapphire rockmaster
Diphlebia euphaeoides  - tropical rockmaster
Diphlebia hybridoides  - giant rockmaster
Diphlebia lestoides  - whitewater rockmaster
Diphlebia nymphoides  - arrowhead rockmaster

Notes 
Until recently Diphlebia was a member of the family Diphlebiidae.

References 

Lestoideidae
Zygoptera genera
Odonata of Australia
Endemic fauna of Australia
Taxa named by Edmond de Sélys Longchamps
Damselflies